FUBAR is a 2002 Canadian film directed by Michael Dowse and written by Dave Lawrence, Michael Dowse and Paul Spence, following the lives of two lifelong friends and head-bangers, Terry Cahill and Dean Murdoch. FUBAR debuted at the Sundance Film Festival. Since its release, it has gained a cult status in North America, particularly in Western Canada.

FUBAR was filmed and set in and around Calgary, Alberta, and was filmed entirely with digital cinematography on a Canon XL1 and a shoestring budget that required Dave Lawrence to max out his credit card and caused his dad to refinance their family home in order to complete the movie.

FUBAR features characters created by Dave Lawrence and Paul Spence that they developed based on the head-banger subculture. Terry Cahill, one of the main characters of the film played by Lawrence was based on a character Lawrence created at Loose Moose Theatre in the mid-90s. Many people featured in the movie (including the fist-fighters) were bystanders, who thought that the filmmakers were shooting a documentary on the common man. FUBAR did not have a set script, only a rough outline from which the actors improvised.

Plot
FUBAR is the story of two lifelong friends, Terry Cahill (Dave Lawrence) and Dean Murdoch (Paul Spence), who have grown up together: shotgunning their first beers, forming their first garage band, and growing the great Canadian mullet known as "Hockey Hair". The lives of these Alberta everymen are brought to the big screen by documentarian Farrel Mitchner (Gordon Skilling), a young director who decides to take a look at Terry and Dean through a lens, exploring the depths of their friendship, the fragility of life, growing up gracefully, and the art and science of drinking beer "like a man".

Their lives are complicated by a snubbing by their "party leader" Troy, better known as Tron (Andrew Sparacino).  When Farrel discovers that Dean is hiding a serious case of testicular cancer, the wheels are set in motion for Dean to seek treatment from Dr. S.C. Lim (Dr. S.C. Lim).  With Dean's last weekend before surgery approaching, Terry decides to take Dean, Farrel and the film crew camping.  Things take an unexpected turn by the third day, and Terry and Dean must cope with further tragedy.

Cast

Reception 
FUBAR received mixed reviews. On Rotten Tomatoes it has an approval rating of 55% based on reviews from 11 critics, with an average rating of 6.0/10.

Paul Dale of The List gave it 3 out of 5 and wrote: "The gloriously stupid levels of debauchery reached in this film will have a strange resonance for anyone who lived through the Thatcherite bedsit stinkfest that was pre-Acid House Britain."
Kevin N. Laforest of the Montreal Film Journal compared the film to This is Spinal Tap "only with more pathetic protagonists- and funnier!"
Empire gave it 2 out 5.

Soundtrack

A soundtrack album, FUBAR: The Album, was released in 2003. The album includes songs from The New Pornographers, Chixdiggit and Sloan.

Sequel

After the success of FUBAR, its sequel, FUBAR 2: Balls to the Wall, secured a $4-million budget based only on the scriptment marking the first time ever Telefilm Canada green lit a film without a complete script.

Filmed in Edmonton and Fort Saskatchewan, Alberta, the plot involves Terry and Dean moving to Fort McMurray to earn easy money in the oil patch. Similar to the first FUBAR film, the dialogue was improvised but the budget was significantly larger than the first film. The sequel was the first Canadian film to premier at the Midnight Madness slot at the 2010 Toronto International Film Festival (TIFF) on September 9, 2010. The film was released throughout Canada on October 1, 2010.

The sequel was well received. On Rotten Tomatoes it has a 90% rating based on reviews from 10 critics.

Television series

On February 10, 2017, Rogers Media and VICE Studios Canada announced an eight-episode television series, FUBAR: Age of Computer, that continued the legacy of the original FUBAR films. The series captured the experiences of Terry Cahill, played by Dave Lawrence, and Dean Murdoch, played by Paul Spence, exploring the internet for the first time. The show features real-life interactions with various experts and influencers online. FUBAR: Age of Computer was inspired by Dave Lawrence's character, Terry.

The series was filmed in Montreal, Quebec, and premiered on November 3, 2017, and aired on Viceland and CityTV

In 2022, TNT FUBAR was released and is aired through the streaming site Swearnet. This series showcases Terry Cahill, played by Dave Lawrence, as he is living back home in Calgary, Alberta. He is joined by his cousin Shank played by North Darling and his wife Trish, played by Terra Hazelton. The series shows Terry renting out Shank’s basement, his attempted divorce from his wife Trish and a misunderstanding with a multi-level marketing scheme that leads Terry to Bret Hart, played by Bret Hart.

Mobile game
On January 8, 2020, Kano Applications Inc. announced the worldwide launch of new mobile game, Fubar: Just Give'r, developed in collaboration with East Side Games and BT Productions. This narrative clicker idle game available on iOS and Android picks up where the movies left off with all new storylines and exciting weekly events. Players will join the iconic FUBAR (film) duo, Terry and Deaner, and help them as they embark on a quest to beat the World Record for Longest Party Streak.

References

External links

 
 
 

2002 films
2000s English-language films
English-language Canadian films
Canadian comedy films
Canadian mockumentary films
Films directed by Michael Dowse
2002 comedy films
Films set in Calgary
Films shot in Calgary
2002 directorial debut films
Culture of Calgary
2000s Canadian films